501st may refer to:

Fiction 
501st Legion (Star Wars), fictional legion within the Star Wars expanded universe
 501st Joint Fighter Wing "Strike Witches", a fictional air force unit in the anime series Strike Witches

Military 
501st Heavy Panzer Battalion
501st Squadron (disambiguation), several units

United States
501st Combat Support Wing
501st Infantry Regiment (United States)
501st Military Intelligence Battalion (United States)
501st Military Intelligence Brigade (United States)
501st Sustainment Brigade (United States)
501st Aircraft Control and Warning Battalion, a forerunner of the 603rd Air Control Squadron
501st Reconnaissance Battalion, a former unit of the 15th Cavalry Regiment
501st Bombardment Group, a forerunner of the 501st Combat Support Wing
501st Tactical Missile Wing, a former unit of the United States Third Air Force

Other uses 
501st Legion, a fan-based organization dedicated to screen-accurate replicas of villain costumes from the Star Wars universe

See also
 501 (disambiguation)